KCLR may refer to:

 KCLR (AM), a radio station (1530 AM) licensed to Ralls, Texas, United States
 KCLR-FM, a radio station (99.3 FM) licensed to Boonville, Missouri, United States
 KCLR 96FM, a radio station that broadcasts to Carlow and Kilkenny in Ireland
 Cliff Hatfield Memorial Airport (ICAO code KCLR)